Werner Friese (30 March 1946 – 28 September 2016) was a German football player. He was part of the East German team for its only World Cup appearance in West Germany 1974, as a backup goalkeeper. However, he did not earn any caps for East Germany. He also played for 1. FC Lokomotive Leipzig.

References

1946 births
2016 deaths
German footballers
East German footballers
East Germany under-21 international footballers
Association football goalkeepers
1974 FIFA World Cup players
1. FC Lokomotive Leipzig players
Dresdner SC players
FC Sachsen Leipzig players
DDR-Oberliga players
German expatriate sportspeople in Ukraine
Footballers from Dresden
FC Shakhtar Donetsk non-playing staff